The firethorn leaf miner (Phyllonorycter leucographella) is a moth of the family Gracillariidae. It is native to southern Europe (Mediterranean regions of France, Spain, Greece, Albania, Russia (Crimea), Turkey, and the southern part of former Yugoslavia where its principal host plant is native) and was probably introduced accidentally into several countries in western Europe on transported plant material. It has now been recorded as far north as Finland and east to Hungary. It was first recorded in Great Britain in 1989. Nash et al. (1995) studied the spread of this species in Great Britain. Besides the "natural" spread of the insect, they found several foci of colonization outside the main distribution range that were undoubtedly due to human activities.

The wingspan is 6 to 8 mm. The moth flies in two to three generations per year. In Great Britain, adults are on wing in April and October.

The larvae mainly feed on firethorn (Pyracantha coccinea), but have also been recorded on hawthorn (Crataegus species). They feed inside a long mine close to the upper leaf surface and overwinter in the mine.

External links
 UKmoths
 Plant Parasites of Europe

leucographella
Leaf miners
Moths described in 1850
Moths of Europe
Taxa named by Philipp Christoph Zeller